In algebraic geometry, the moduli stack of formal group laws is a stack classifying formal group laws and isomorphisms between them. It is a "geometric “object" that underlies the chromatic approach to the stable homotopy theory, a branch of algebraic topology.

Currently, it is not known whether  is a derived stack or not. Hence, it is typical to work with stratifications. Let  be given so that  consists of formal group laws over R of height exactly n. They form a stratification of the moduli stack  .   is faithfully flat. In fact,  is of the form  where  is a profinite group called the Morava stabilizer group. The Lubin–Tate theory describes how the strata  fit together.

References

Further reading 

Topology